Tortyra violacea is a moth of the family Choreutidae. It is known from Brazil.

References

Tortyra
Taxa named by Alois Friedrich Rogenhofer
Moths described in 1875